Peter August Poppe (17 August 1870 – 13 February 1933) was a Norwegian-born engineer, designer and developer of engines and complete motor vehicles for the British motor industry. He was a co-founder of the engine manufacturer White and Poppe.

Biography
Poppe was born at Skogn in Nord-Trøndelag, Norway. He graduated from Horten Technical School  (Horten tekniske skole) in Vestfold.  He was employed by Kongsberg Gruppen and later lent by them to the weapons factory, Steyr Mannlicher at Steyr, Austria.

In August 1897 he met with trained watchmaker Alfred James White, son of English watchmaker,  Joseph White (1836-1906). In September 1899, with financial backing from the White family they incorporated White and Poppe Limited and started in business in Coventry, England. Peter August Poppe was technical director. In November 1919 the White family sold their share to steady customers, Dennis Brothers Limited of Guildford. Poppe remained with the business until 1923 then joined the Rover Company as chief engineer.

It is claimed that after the Armistice in 1918 Poppe's partner, White, was offered a knighthood which he declined because Poppe as a foreign national was unable to receive the same honour.

He had been elected a member of the Institution of Automobile Engineers by 1909.

Poppe put into production at Rover his already completed design for a new 2-litre car. It became their 14/45. Poppe's new engine was considered very advanced but complex particularly in its valve gear. There were numerous other smaller innovative complexities as well. The resulting car though very comfortable was heavy and considered underpowered.   Within twelve months Rover had added a 2.4-litre 16/50 to their range, a sister car with a larger engine. They were a disaster for Rover, expensive to build and not popular with customers. Around 2,000 were built. So Poppe designed another car with a 2-litre six-cylinder engine but similar results. His last design became the foundation of all Rover engines until 1948. Rover was saved by Spencer Wilks' new management practices and engineering techniques.

Eventually in 1929 Peter Poppe fell out with managing director Frank Searle and Poppe left in September that year.

He had a stroke and died suddenly at Coventry on 13 February 1933, aged 62.   His wife had predeceased him by five years.

Eldest son Erling Poppe is separately mentioned. Olaf Poppe was Rover's chief planning engineer in 1949 and was also one of the team that developed Rover's gas turbines. In the same period Gunnar Poppe was works manager for Sunbeam-Talbot having  joined the Rootes Group after ten years, 1923 to 1932, with Austin. He was captain of the London Welsh Rugby fifteen.

Notes

References

1870 births
1933 deaths
People from Levanger
Norwegian engineers
British automotive pioneers
Norwegian expatriates in Austria-Hungary
Norwegian emigrants to the United Kingdom
British automotive engineers
British motorcycle designers
British motorcycle pioneers